Pterarene sakashitai is a species of small sea snail, a marine gastropod mollusk, in the family Liotiidae.

References

 Okutani, T. (ed.), Marine Mollusks in Japan. Tokai University Press, Tokyo, 89-101
 Higo, S., Callomon, P. & Goto, Y. (1999). Catalogue and bibliography of the marine shell-bearing Mollusca of Japan. Osaka. : Elle Scientific Publications. 749 pp

External links
 To World Register of Marine Species
 Geocities: photo of Pterarene sakashitai

sakashitai
Gastropods described in 1977